Julia Zisman (born 1961) is a Russian-born Israeli painter.

Biography
Julia Zisman was born in Chelyabinsk. She has a disability and uses a wheelchair. Zisman graduated from the department of Easel Painting the Russian Academy of Arts in Moscow. In 1991, she immigrated to Israel and settled in Haifa. Since then she has been a member of the Israeli Painters and Sculptors Association. Her works are in private collections in the US, Italy, France, Germany, Russia and Israel.

Artistic style
Zisman paints in a figurative and narrative style using "similes that expose her personal codes like in a private diary."  She says her painting sets her free, allowing her to "wander like the wind and fly like a spirit."

References

External links
Official Site 
old site
Zisman's works on Tarbut Gallery
Another collection of Zisman's works

Israeli painters
20th-century Russian painters
21st-century Russian painters
1961 births
Living people
Israeli women painters
Russian women painters
20th-century Russian women artists
21st-century Russian women artists
People from Chelyabinsk
Artists with disabilities
Russian emigrants to Israel